Vijay Singh  (born 22 February 1963), nicknamed "The Big Fijian", is a Fijian professional golfer. He has won 34 events on the PGA Tour, including three major championships: one Masters title (2000) and two PGA Championships (1998, 2004). He is the first person of South Asian descent to win a major championship. He was elected to the World Golf Hall of Fame in 2006.

Singh reached world number one in the Official World Golf Ranking for 32 weeks in 2004 and 2005.  Vijay was the 12th man to reach the world No. 1 ranking and was the only new world No. 1 in the 2000s decade. Singh was the leading PGA Tour money winner in 2003, 2004 and 2008. He also captured the FedEx Cup in 2008.

Career history

Early life and amateur career
Singh recollected to reporters about his childhood: "When we were kids we couldn't afford golf balls so we had to make do with coconuts. My father used to say, 'Little Vijay, golf balls don't fall off trees you know,' so I found some that did!" Growing up, he played snooker, cricket, football, and the island's most popular sport, rugby. He is the son of Mohan Singh, an airplane technician who also taught golf. Growing up, he admired the swing of Tom Weiskopf, using it as an early model for his own.

Professional career

1984–1988
Two years after turning professional, Singh won the 1984 Malaysian PGA Championship. However, his career was plunged into crisis after he was suspended from the Asia Golf Circuit in 1985 over allegations he doctored his scorecard. It was alleged that he lowered his score from one over to one under in order to make the cut, but Singh denies this, saying that in any case, it should only have resulted in disqualification from the event rather than a ban. After investigation by the Tour of this and other alleged violations proved true, John Bender, Asian PGA Tour president, issued Singh a lifetime ban on Asian PGA Tour play.

Singh felt he had been more harshly treated because the marker was "the son of a VIP in the Indonesian PGA." He then took a job at the Keningau Club in Sabah, Malaysia, before his move to the Miri Golf Club in Sarawak. While this was a period of hardship for him, he continued to gain experience. He saved the money he needed to resurrect his career and began to re-enter tournaments. In 1988 he teamed up with a sponsor, Red Baron, which funded a trip to Africa to compete on the now-defunct Safari Circuit where he captured his first event, the 1988 Nigerian Open, locals cheered him loudly. At the end of that year he entered the European Tour Qualifying school for the second consecutive year, and was successful on this occasion.

1989–1997: First wins in Europe and America
In 1989, Singh won his first European Tour title at the Volvo Open Championship in Italy and finished 24th on the European Tour Order of Merit, putting his early struggles firmly behind him. He won four times in 1989, at the Volvo Open di Firenze, Ivory Coast Open, Nigerian Open and Zimbabwe Open. He also finished tied for 23rd at The Open Championship. He won on the European Tour again in 1990 and did so twice in 1992. He also won several tournaments in Asia and Africa in this period.

Singh entered the PGA Tour in 1993, winning his first PGA Tour event, the Buick Classic in a playoff over Mark Wiebe. That victory led to his being named the 1993 PGA Tour Rookie of the Year. After being hampered with back and neck problems in 1994, he came back to win the Buick Classic again in 1995 as well as the Phoenix Open. After playing well in 1996 (but with no victories), he won both the Memorial Tournament and the Buick Open in 1997.

1998–2004: Major champion to world number 1
In 1998, Singh was victorious at the PGA Championship at Sahalee Country Club in Sammamish, Washington, playing a 70-66-67-68 over the four days (the 66 tied a course record) and earning him his first Major title. He followed this up by winning The Masters in 2000, with a three-stroke victory over Ernie Els.

Singh did not win on the PGA Tour in 2001, but finished the year with a Tour-best 14 top-10 finishes and was fourth on the money list with $3,440,829 for the year. In 2002, he won at the Shell Houston Open at TPC at The Woodlands, setting a new tournament 72-hole scoring record with a 266, and at the Tour Championship, winning by two strokes over Charles Howell III.

2003 proved to be a very successful year for Singh. He won four tournaments, had 18 top-10 finishes and was the PGA Tour's money leader (and had the second-highest single-season total in PGA Tour history) with $7,573,907, beating Tiger Woods by $900,494, though Singh played 27 tournaments compared to Woods' 18 tournaments. Singh also tied a 9-hole scoring record at the U.S. Open with a 29 on the back nine of his second round. His victories came at the Phoenix Open, the EDS Byron Nelson Championship, the John Deere Classic and the FUNAI Classic at the Walt Disney World Resort. He narrowly lost the vote for the PGA of America's Player of the Year to Tiger Woods.

However, the 2003 season was also spotted with controversy involving Singh surrounding the year's event at the Bank of America Colonial. LPGA star Annika Sörenstam became the first woman to play at a PGA Tour event since Babe Zaharias at the 1945 Los Angeles Open. Surrounding this fervor, Singh was misquoted as having said that Sörenstam "didn't belong" on the men's tour and that he would not play if he were paired with her. What he actually said is that he would not be paired with her because his playing partner was being selected from the past champion's pool. Singh later clarified, "There are guys out there trying to make a living. It's not a ladies' tour. If she wants to play, she should—or any other woman for that matter—if they want to play the man's tour, they should qualify and play like everybody else."

Singh began 2004 by winning the AT&T Pebble Beach National Pro-Am at −16 and winning $954,000 in prize money. This was his first win on tour in 2004 and his 16th all-time on the PGA Tour. It was his 12th consecutive top-10 finish, which is two shy of Jack Nicklaus' all-time record.

Singh won the final major of 2004, winning the PGA Championship, his third major, in a three-hole aggregate playoff over Justin Leonard and Chris DiMarco. Singh was the leader by one shot over Leonard going into the final round, but made no birdies in the final round, finishing regulation at 67-68-69-76=280. His final round of 76 was the highest winning score by a major champion since 1955. The playoff was a tense affair, and Singh's birdie on the first playoff hole, his first birdie of the day, proved to be the difference.

On 6 September 2004 (Labor Day), Singh won the Deutsche Bank Championship in Norton, Massachusetts. With the win, he overtook Tiger Woods at the top of the Official World Golf Ranking, ending Woods' streak of 264 weeks at the top of the golf world.

Singh finished the 2004 season with a career-best nine victories, 18 top-10s, and a record $10,905,166 in earnings and was named the PGA Tour's and PGA of America's Player of the Year. The former award is decided by a vote of active PGA Tour players.

2005–2008: Success over 40 and FedEx Cup victory
Despite picking up a win early in 2005, Singh lost his world number 1 ranking when Tiger Woods won the Ford Championship at Doral on 6 March, but just two weeks later he took it back again after notching up top-three finishes in three consecutive weeks. Following Woods' win at the 2005 Masters, Singh once again lost his place as World No. 1 in the Official World Golf Ranking and finished tied for fifth place. In April, he became the youngest living person elected to the World Golf Hall of Fame, garnering 56% of the ballot. Thirty-year-old Karrie Webb was inducted into the Hall of Fame in October 2005, but Singh remained the youngest living electee, as Webb qualified for the Hall without an election process. (The 19th century great Tom Morris, Jr., who was elected in 1975, died at age 24.) Singh deferred his induction for a year, and it took place in October 2006.

In 2006, Singh played enough European Tour events to be listed on the European Tour Order of Merit title for the first time since 1995.

At the start of the 2007 season, Singh won the Mercedes-Benz Championship which was the first FedEx Cup event in PGA Tour history. This win got Singh his 18th tour win over the age of 40, surpassing Sam Snead as most over 40 wins, and making all-time over 40 tour winner. He won again at The Arnold Palmer Invitational in March, but did not win for the rest of the year which turned into a disappointing year for Singh. He did not finish in a top ten of a major for the first time in ten years and finished 10th in the FedEx Cup race. He went through swing changes during the end of 2007 which resulted in weeks of missed cuts and staying outside the top ten through the Presidents Cup.

A new swing brought big changes for Singh in 2008, although he had good opportunities at Pebble Beach and Bay Hill, he was not competing at a high level for the first half of the year. His game was plagued by poor putting for the better part of two years, but his season started to turn around with a tie for fifth at the Travelers Championship. After missing the cut at The Open Championship, Singh won the WGC-Bridgestone Invitational in early August for his first win of the year and first World Golf Championship. His win had been a relief after missing short putts throughout the week. He missed the cut the following two weeks including at Oakland Hills for the PGA Championship and entered the PGA Tour FedEx Cup playoffs ranked 7th in the standings. At the first playoff event, Singh prevailed for his first FedEx Cup win defeating Sergio García and Kevin Sutherland in a playoff. On the first playoff hole García and Singh matched long birdie putts before Singh won with birdie on the second playoff hole. Singh was propelled into first place in the FedEx Cup race with three events remaining. At the second event of the playoffs, he triumphed once again, this time at the Deutsche Bank Championship bewildering the field with a five strokes victory and a final round 63. He had won three times in his last five starts and created an almost insurmountable lead in the points race. He would not contend in the remaining two events, but by playing in both the 2008 FedEx Cup title belonged to Singh. His season which looked to be a major disappointment in July turned into an historic year for Singh: he won the PGA Tour money list for the third time in his career and he surpassed Harry Cooper for most PGA Tour wins of all time for a non-American.

Singh has won 22 times on the PGA Tour since turning 40 – beating the record previously set by Sam Snead. He is the second man to reach $60 million in PGA Tour career earnings, after Tiger Woods. His 34 career victories are the most on the PGA Tour by a non-American player and place him 14th on the all-time list. He has spent over 540 weeks ranked in the top 10 of the Official World Golf Ranking. Singh's longevity on the PGA Tour and his number of wins earn him a lifetime exemption on the PGA Tour.

Kenny Perry, another player who found success at a late age is good friends with Singh, who calls him "Biggie". Of Singh, Perry said "Vijay has always been good to me. We talk a lot. He wants to know how my family is doing. I think the world of him."

2009–present: Decline
After the 2008 playoffs, Singh announced his withdrawal from a couple of Asian Tour events because of a nagging back injury and was advised by doctors to rest. He missed two and a half months, returning to win Tiger Woods's tournament, the Chevron World Challenge at Sherwood Country Club in California in December. It was his first victory in the event. During the start of the 2009 season Singh announced that he would miss three weeks after undergoing arthroscopic surgery to repair a torn meniscus in his right knee. Singh had a mediocre 2009 season, with no top 5 finishes and ended the year with his lowest ever ranking on the PGA Tour money list in 68th.

His poor form continued into 2010, resulting in him being 66th on the PGA Tour money list. He dropped out of the top 50 in the world rankings for the first time since the early 1990s.

After returning from knee surgery, Singh started the 2011 season making five out of his first five cuts. In February, Singh was in contention to win his first PGA Tour Title since 2008 at the Waste Management Phoenix Open in Scottsdale, Arizona. Despite shooting a final round 66, Singh finished two shots behind Jason Dufner and eventual winner Mark Wilson. A couple of weeks later, Singh was in contention again, this time at the Northern Trust Open at Riviera Country Club. However, he came up short again, not helped by back-to-back bogeys on holes 12 and 13. He would eventually finish two shots back of the winner Aaron Baddeley, although he did secure second spot on his own. This early season form however was not enough to secure a spot at the opening World Golf Championship of the year, the WGC-Accenture Match Play Championship the following week. However, at number 10 in the 2011 FedEx Cup standings, it was just enough to secure a spot at the WGC-Cadillac Championship in March.

On 6 June 2011, Singh missed his tee-time for the U.S. Open qualifying in Columbus, Ohio. At the time, this ended the longest active streak of consecutive majors played by a professional golfer, at 67.

On 30 January 2013, Singh admitted to using deer-antler spray while not knowing that it is a banned substance. The PGA Tour later dropped its case against him. On 8 May 2013, Singh sued the PGA Tour for exposing him to public humiliation and ridicule during a 12-week investigation into his use of deer-antler spray. On 20 November 2018, the PGA Tour and Singh announced that the lawsuit had been settled. The PGA Tour confirmed that it does not believe that Singh intended to gain an unfair advantage over his fellow competitors in this matter. Other terms of the settlement were not announced. 

In 2016, he finished second at the Quicken Loans National, three strokes behind winner Billy Hurley III.

In March 2019, Singh shot his way into the final group of the final round of the Honda Classic.  Singh shot even-par to finish sixth, three strokes behind winner Keith Mitchell. At age 56, he nearly became the oldest winner in PGA Tour history.

PGA Tour Champions career
Singh played his first PGA Tour Champions event in 2013, finishing T6 at the Pacific Links Hawai'i Championship.

On 23 April 2017, Singh won the Bass Pro Shops Legends of Golf with Carlos Franco.

On 11 March 2018, Singh won the Toshiba Classic.

On 15 July 2018, Singh won one of the PGA Tour Champions' major tournaments, the Constellation Senior Players Championship in a playoff over Jeff Maggert.

On 11 November 2018, Singh won the season-ending Charles Schwab Cup Championship in Phoenix, Arizona. The victory was worth $440,000. By winning the tournament, he also finished fourth in the season-long Charles Schwab Cup, winning an additional $200,000.

Personal life 
An Indo-Fijian practising Hinduism, Singh was born in Lautoka, Fiji and grew up in Nadi. A resident of Ponte Vedra Beach, Florida, he is known for his meticulous preparation, often arriving hours before, and staying long after his tournament rounds to work on his game on the driving range and putting greens.

Singh has a brother named Krishna who is also a professional golfer.

Media relations

Controversy surrounded Singh in 2003 before the Bank of America Colonial. Annika Sörenstam was scheduled to play the event, and Singh was quoted as saying, "I hope she misses the cut ... because she doesn't belong out here." He later said that the substance of his interview to an Associated Press reporter was that she would be displacing some other struggling male player, for whom he had his sympathies. However, the media focused on this statement. Golf Digest wrote that Singh had become "pro golf's bad guy".

After Singh's win at the Masters, Ernie Els took issue with some of the negative press his friend received. He wrote an article in Sports Illustrated to defend him, saying, "Golf should be proud of Vijay Singh." Later Els said of Singh "He's a wonderful guy. I've known him for the better part of 10 years now. He's a great competitor. I think people have a misconception of Vijay. He's a really good guy."

In May 2005, Singh was appointed a goodwill ambassador for Fiji. He said that he did not expect anything in return from the Fijian government for representing his country. At a press conference on 18 May 2005, Singh commented on what he said was a deterioration in race relations in Fiji, saying that for such a small country, people of all races should live together, put their differences aside, and get on with life. Relations between Indo-Fijians and indigenous Fijians had been more harmonious when he was younger, he said.

Professional wins (65)

PGA Tour wins (34)

*Note: The 1997 Memorial Tournament was shortened to 54 holes due to rain.

PGA Tour playoff record (8–4)

European Tour wins (13)

1Co-sanctioned by the Sunshine Tour
2Co-sanctioned by the Asian Tour

European Tour playoff record (2–0)

Asian Tour wins (5)

1Co-sanctioned by the European Tour
2Co-sanctioned by the Korean Tour

Asian Tour playoff record (2–0)

Sunshine Tour wins (2)

1Co-sanctioned by the European Tour

Asia Golf Circuit wins (1)

Safari Circuit wins (4)

Swedish Golf Tour wins (1)

Other Asian wins (1)
1984 Malaysian PGA Championship

Other wins (7)

Other playoff record (1–2)

PGA Tour Champions wins (4)

PGA Tour Champions playoff record (1–0)

Major championships

Wins (3)

1Defeated Justin Leonard and Chris DiMarco in three-hole playoff: Singh (3-3-4=10), Leonard (4-3-x=x), and DiMarco (4-3-x=x)

Results timeline
Results not in chronological order in 2020.

CUT = missed the half way cut
WD = withdrew
"T" indicates a tie for a place.
NT = No tournament due to COVID-19 pandemic

Summary

Most consecutive cuts made – 15 (2002 PGA – 2006 U.S. Open)
Longest streak of top-10s – 7 (2004 PGA – 2006 U.S. Open)

Results in The Players Championship

CUT = missed the halfway cut
"T" indicates a tie for a place

World Golf Championships

Wins (1)

Results timeline

1Cancelled due to 9/11

QF, R16, R32, R64 = Round in which player lost in match play
"T" = tied
NT = No tournament
Note that the HSBC Champions did not become a WGC event until 2009.

Senior major championships

Wins (1)

Results timeline
Results not in chronological order before 2022.

CUT = missed the halfway cut 
WD = withdrew
"T" indicates a tie for a place
NT = No tournament due to COVID-19 pandemic

PGA Tour career summary

*As of the 2020 season.
There is a summary of Singh's European Tour career here.

Team appearances
Amateur
Eisenhower Trophy (representing Fiji): 1980

Professional
Presidents Cup (International Team): 1994, 1996, 1998 (winners), 2000, 2003 (tie), 2005, 2007, 2009
World Cup (representing Fiji): 2001, 2002, 2013
Alfred Dunhill Challenge (representing Australasia): 1995

See also
 List of golfers with most PGA Tour wins
 List of golfers with most European Tour wins
 List of golfers with most Asian Tour wins
 List of men's major championships winning golfers
 Longest PGA Tour win streaks
 Most PGA Tour wins in a year
 Pravasi Bharatiya Divas
 Pravasi Bharatiya Samman

References

External links

Fijian male golfers
European Tour golfers
PGA Tour golfers
PGA Tour Champions golfers
Winners of men's major golf championships
Winners of senior major golf championships
World Golf Hall of Fame inductees
Companions of the Order of Fiji
Recipients of Pravasi Bharatiya Samman
Doping cases in golf
Sports controversies
Sportspeople of Indian descent
Fijian people of Indian descent
Fijian emigrants to the United States
Sportspeople from Lautoka
Fijian Hindus
Golfers from Jacksonville, Florida
People from Ponte Vedra Beach, Florida
1963 births
Living people